Events from 2020 in Christmas Island.

Incumbents 

 Administrative head: Natasha Griggs

Events 
Ongoing – COVID-19 pandemic in Oceania

 17 February – After their repatriation from China to Christmas Island on a government-chartered evacuation flight on 3 February as a result of the pandemic, the first group of Australians left the island.

Deaths

References 

Years of the 21st century in Christmas Island
Christmas Island